Iuliu Hossu (30 January 1885 – 28 May 1970) was a Romanian Greek-Catholic prelate who served as the Bishop of Cluj-Gherla. Pope Paul VI elevated Hossu to the rank of cardinal in pectore, that is, secretly, in 1969 but did not publish his appointment until after Hossu's death. The Communist authorities arrested Bishop Hossu on 28 October 1948. From 1950 to 1955 he was detained as political prisoner at the Sighet Prison. He spent the rest of his life under house arrest and died in 1970.

Pope Francis confirmed Hossu and six other prelates' beatification in 2019 and it was celebrated in Blaj, Romania on 2 June 2019. Pope Francis personally presided over the beatification as well.

Life

Education and priesthood

Iuliu Hossu was born in 1885 in Milaș in the then-Austro-Hungarian empire to Ioan Hossu (1856–?) and Victoria Măriuțiu. His brothers were Vasile (a barrister) and Traian (a doctor) and Ioan (an engineer). His paternal grandparents were Vasile Hossu (1831–1889) and Maria Sebeni; his paternal cousin was Iustin Hossu. A nephew was Stefan Hossu. His paternal aunts were Alecsa and Nicolae Hossu (1859–1914). His great-grandfather was Iosif Hossu (1822–46) and before him were Nicolae (1768–1841) and Petre (c. 1525).

Hossu studied at the ecclesial school in Cluj and later in Budapest. His grade four studies were overseen at a Roman Catholic school in Târgu Mureș while grade five to eight was spent at a Greek-Catholic school in Blaj. He also studied at the Vienna college in Austria and later at the Pontifical Urbanian Athenaeum in Rome where he went on to obtain doctorates in philosophical studies in 1906 and in theological studies in 1908.

His uncle Vasile Hossu (30.01.1866–13.01.1916) ordained him to the priesthood on 27 March 1910. He completed further studies from 1910 to 1911 and served as an archivist and a librarian. From 1911 to 1914 he served as the personal aide to the Bishop of Gherla (his uncle Vasile) and became friends with Prime Minister István Tisza. He later served as a chaplain to the Romanian soldiers in the Austro-Hungarian armed forces during World War I between 1914 and 1917. His brothers Vasile and Traian were mobilized as soldiers during the war while his brother Ioan was made a rail officer at the Oradea station. His cousin Iustin fought and died on the Serbian front. The death of his cousin prompted him to join as a chaplain so the new lieutenant left in December 1914 from Timișoara to Vienna where he tended to the soldiers.

Episcopate

Austria-Hungary
Pope Benedict XV appointed him as the Bishop of Gherla on 17 April 1917 and he received his episcopal consecration on 4 December 1917; the Blessed Karl I nominated him for the position on 3 March and forwarded it to the pope for his confirmation.

Great National Assembly of Alba Iulia
In November 1918 Bishop Hossu was nominated representative by right in the National Assemby of all Romanians in Hungary, which declared the Union of Transylvania with Romania on 1 December 1918. On 1 December 1918 Hossu read the Resolution of the National Assembly in front of the crowds gathered in Alba Iulia, preceding it with the following words: "Brethren, the hour of fulfillment is this one, when God Almighty is speaking out His centuries-old longing for justice through His faithful people. Today, by our decision, Greater Romania is achieved, one and indivisible, all Romanians from these lands happily calling: We are joining forever our Motherland, Romania! [..] Justice has prevailed". Next day, at Iuliu Maniu's proposal, the High National Romanian Council mandated representatives Vasile Goldiș, Alexandru Vaida-Voevod, Iuliu Hossu, and Miron Cristea to go to King Ferdinand I and present him with the Resolution of the National Assembly.

Kingdom of Romania
Hossu was named as the Bishop of Cluj-Gherla when the see was transferred on 5 June 1930 and Pope Pius XI later appointed him as the Apostolic Administrator of Maramureș from 1930 until 1931 when a successor for that diocese was named. Hossu was named an Assistant at the Pontifical Throne on 16 September 1936 which made him a Monsignor. He also made the Apostolic Administrator of Oradea Mare from 1941 until 1947 when Pope Pius XII appointed him as such.

Communist repression, forced attempts at union with Orthodox Church
For his opposition to the government, he was forced to flee his diocese on 28 October 1948 but was soon arrested. He was confined at Jilava and Dragoslavele and later at Sighet and Gherla prisons from 1948 to 1964. He was relocated to a convent near Bucharest from that point until 1970, and was transferred to a hospital there in May 1970.

Hossu opposed the forced passage of Greek-Catholic believers to the Romanian Orthodox Church. On 1 October 1948 he gave an Exclamation Decree (ipso facto) to the participants in the Cluj Assembly of the 36 Greek Catholic priests who would decide to break the Greek-Catholic union with the Church of Rome. On 28 October 1948, Hossu was arrested in his episcopal residence in Cluj and taken to the patriarchal villa of Dragoslavele, where he was held under guard in hunger and cold together with the other Greek-Catholic bishops arrested. Both the communist authorities and the leadership of the Romanian Orthodox Church represented by Patriarch Justinian Marina personally offered him the Orthodox metropolitan chair of Moldavia in exchange for renouncing the Catholic faith and the connection with Rome and Catholic Church. Refusing to convert to Orthodoxy, Bishop Iuliu Hossu was first transferred to Căldărușani Monastery, and in 1950 to the Sighet Penitentiary. In 1955 he was taken to Curtea de Argeș, and in 1956 to the Ciorogârla Monastery.

Following the Greek-Catholic Liturgy celebrated at the Church of the Piarists in Cluj on 12 August 1956 by the three united bishops alive at the time, they were dispersed from Ciorogârla. During his forced domicile at Ciorogârla Monastery, Hossu was regularly visited by Orthodox hierarchs, including Justinian Marina, Teoctist Arăpașu and Gherasim Cristea.

Bishop Iuliu Hossu arrived again in Căldăruşani, where he stayed with compulsory residence until the end of his life. According to the memoirs of the Greek-Catholic priest Ioan Mitrofan, Andrei Andreicuţ was also among those who visited Cardinal Iuliu Hossu in Căldărușani.

Cardinalate

On 28 April 1969 he was created a cardinal but Pope Paul VI reserved Hossu in pectore (to be kept secret). His elevation to the rank of cardinal was announced on 5 March 1973, after Hossu's death. On 22 February 1969 the pope had granted a private audience to Monsignor Hieronymus Menges and the prelate asked Paul VI to do something that would encourage the faithful and give them a sign that the Romanian people were close to his heart. Paul VI asked: "what?" The prelate then recommended that the pope raise Hossu and future Servant of God Áron Márton as cardinals and to appoint some priests as monsignors. Archbishop Agostino Casaroli sent his aide not long after this to Bucharest to ask the Minister for Culture whether or not the government would accept the two promotions. The government agreed to accept Márton but not Hossu as a cardinal. Márton learned of this and refused the honor when he learned that the government had rejected Hossu's appointment, with the result that Paul reserved Hossu in pectore and did not make Márton a cardinal.

Death

Hossu died on 28 May 1970 at 9:00am at Colentina Hospital in Bucharest with Bishop Alexandru Todea at his side. He was buried in Bucharest and his last words were recorded as being: "My struggle ends; yours continues". On 7 December 1982 his remains were exhumed and transferred. His burial place is at the Catholic Bellu Cemetery in Bucharest.

Beatification

The beatification process – which conferred the title Servant of God upon him – commenced with the declaration of "nihil obstat" (nothing against) to the cause on 28 January 1997. The eparchial process delved into his life (and that of six other prelates in the joint cause) through the collection of documentation and testimonies. This process spanned from 16 January 1997 until 10 March 2009. The end of this local process saw all the findings taken in boxes to the Congregation for the Causes of Saints in Rome who validated the process on 18 February 2011. The relator was appointed on 27 May 2011 and helps in drafting the Positio dossier with the cause's officials. The dossier was submitted to the C.C.S. in April 2018. All nine theologians voted in favor of the cause in January 2019 and the C.C.S. also voted in favor of it over a month later. Pope Francis confirmed the cause on 19 March 2019 for Hossu and the other six prelates which allows for them to be beatified; it was celebrated in Blaj on 2 June 2019.

There were reports that a papal visit to Romania was being planned for late 2018 and it referred to the fact that Pope Francis would preside over the beatification for Hossu and six others if and when he visits according to Archbishop Ioan Robu. The visit did not occur in 2018 but has been scheduled for mid-2019 which opened the door to Hossu's beatification during the papal visit in Blaj on 2 June during the Mass there.

The current postulator for this joint beatification cause is Fr. Vasile Man. The current relator for the cause is the Conventual Franciscan friar Zdzisław Kijas.

On 25 March 2019, it was confirmed that Pope Francis would beatify Hossu and the other prelates on 2 June at Blaj Romania's Liberty Field. Francis beatified Hossu and the six other prelates as scheduled.

Legacy
Iuliu Hossu's life was the subject of the film  (2019). A street in downtown Cluj-Napoca is named after him.

Notes and references

External links

 
 Catholic Hierarchy 
 Hagiography Circle 

1885 births
1970 deaths
20th-century Christian martyrs
20th-century Eastern Catholic bishops
20th-century venerated Christians
Beatifications by Pope Francis
Eastern Catholic beatified people
Honorary members of the Romanian Academy
People detained by the Securitate
Inmates of Sighet prison
Members of the Senate of Romania
People from Bistrița-Năsăud County
People from the Kingdom of Hungary
Romanian anti-communist clergy
Romanian Austro-Hungarians
Romanian beatified people
Eastern Catholic bishops in Romania
Romanian cardinals
Romanian Greek-Catholic bishops
Delegates of the Great National Assembly of Alba Iulia
Burials at Bellu Cemetery